This is a list of Swedish television related events from 2010.

Events
26 March - Singer and finalist from the fourth season of Idol Mattias Andréasson and his partner Cecilia Ehrling win the fifth season of Let's Dance.
4 June - 14-year-old opera singer Jill Svensson wins the fourth season of Talang 2010.
10 December - Jay Smith wins the seventh season of Idol.

Debuts

Television shows

2000s
Idol (2004-2011, 2013–present)
Let's Dance (2006–present)
Talang (2007-2011, 2014–present)

2010s
1–24 December - Hotell Gyllene knorren

Ending this year

Births

Deaths

See also
2010 in Sweden

References